The Sandown SuperSprint was a Supercars motor racing event held at Sandown Raceway in Melbourne, Victoria, Australia. The event was a semi-regular part of the Supercars Championship—and its previous incarnations, the Australian Touring Car Championship, Shell Championship Series and V8 Supercars Championship between 1965 and 2011, and returned to the championship in 2021.

Format
The event was staged over a three-day weekend, from Friday to Sunday. Three thirty-minute practice sessions were held, two on Friday, one of them was a co-driver session, and one on Saturday. Saturday featured a three-part qualifying session which decides the grid positions for the following 110 kilometre race. Two separated ten-minute qualifying sessions were held on Sunday, which decided the grid for the following 110 km races.

History
Opened in 1962, Sandown Raceway has traditionally been known as the host of endurance races, the first of which was held in 1964, an event which later evolved into the Sandown 500 event. As well as this, Sandown has a long history of hosting sprint rounds of the championship with the circuit hosting the most rounds in championship history. Sandown held its first championship sprint round in 1965, as the only event of the 1965 Australian Touring Car Championship. The race was won by Norm Beechey, who won by over a lap despite starting from towards the back of the grid after mechanical problems in qualifying. Sandown would not hold another championship event until 1970, when the series had expanded to seven rounds.

Since then, in various forms and with the exception of 1975, 1990 and 1993, Sandown has been included in every running of the Australian Touring Car Championship, which later became known as V8 Supercars. From 1972 to 1974, Allan Moffat won three consecutive event wins at the circuit, while in 1976 and 1977 Sandown hosted both a sprint round and the Sandown 500 as part of each championship. In 1978, five-time champion Ian Geoghegan won his last championship round in a Bob Jane Racing entry. Throughout the 1980s, Dick Johnson tied Moffat as the most successful driver at the event with four wins. Dick Jonhson's eponymous team won three further events in 1992, 2000 and 2010. In 2000, Steven Ellery won his only career race at the event. The 2001 and 2002 events were the final events of each championship, however in both years the championship had already been decided by the time of the Sandown round. In 2001, Todd Kelly scored his first championship round win. In 2002, Marcos Ambrose gave the Ford AU Falcon a round win in the last event of its largely unsuccessful era as the pre-eminent Ford model.

Meanwhile, in 1999 the annual 500 kilometre endurance race left Sandown and moved to Queensland Raceway, with the endurance events also joining the championship calendar for the first time since 1977. With the 500 kilometre endurance race and the Bathurst 1000 now regular fixtures of the championship, when the Sandown 500 returned to the calendar from 2003 to 2007, the sprint round became obsolete. The sprint round then returned from 2008 to 2011 in the period in which the Phillip Island 500 replaced Sandown's endurance race. In the final sprint round to date in 2011, Will Davison won the round despite only finishing fourth and third in a rain-affected weekend.

In 2020, the 500 was again scheduled to be moved, this time to The Bend Motorsport Park, which itself was not held due to the COVID-19 pandemic. Because of this, Sandown was initially scheduled to host its first sprint event since 2011, but the event was also later cancelled altogether due to the COVID-19 pandemic. Sandown was initially given reserve status on the 2021 calendar, and was then scheduled to replace the Melbourne 400 after the postponement of the 2021 Australian Grand Prix. Shane van Gisbergen won all three races, including the first from 17th on the grid, only two weeks after breaking his collarbone in a mountain biking accident.

Winners

Notes
  – In 1976 and 1977, Sandown Raceway also hosted a second championship round, the Hang Ten 400.
  – From 2003 to 2007 and from 2012 to 2019, Sandown Raceway hosted the Sandown 500 as a championship round.

Multiple winners

By driver

By team

By manufacturer

Event names and sponsors
1965, 1972–74, 1976–82, 1984, 1987–89, 1991–92, 1994–2001: Sandown
1970: Sterling Southern 60
1971: Marlboro Southern Sixty
1983: International Motor Show Trophy
1985: Pye Audio Round 2
1986: Castrol Challenge
2002: Betta Electrical V8 Ultimate
2008: Midas 400
2009–11: Norton 360 Sandown Challenge
2021–22: Penrite Oil Sandown SuperSprint

See also
 List of Australian Touring Car Championship races

References

Supercars Championship races

Motorsport at Sandown